The Second Stage is a 1981 book by American feminist, activist and writer  Betty Friedan, best known for her earlier book The Feminine Mystique.

Summary
Friedan contends that "first stage" of feminism, a movement intended to liberate women from their traditional role as only mothers and house-wives, was coming to an end with the deadline for the ratification of The Equal Rights Amendment, and that it was time to take feminism to a new stage, which could better deal with the issues of a new generation of women.

Issues discussed include: the double enslavement of women at work and at home, the social evolution of masculinity, political backlash to feminist lobbying, developments in the field of management and leadership, and the need to recognize the social and economic value of traditional female occupations.

References

Feminism and history
Feminist books
1981 non-fiction books